Mavrommati or Mavromati may refer to:

Places in Greece
 Mavrommati, Boeotia, a village in the municipal unit of Thespies, Boeotia
 Mavrommati, Karditsa, a village in the municipal unit of Mouzaki, Karditsa regional unit
 Mavrommati, Ithomi, a village in the municipal unit of Ithomi, Messenia
 Mavrommati, Messini, a village in the municipal unit of Messini, Messenia
 Mavrommati, Rhodope, a village in the municipal unit of Neo Sidirochori, Rhodope regional unit
 Mavromati, another name for Agios Thomas, Boeotia

People
 Oleg Mavromati, Russian filmmaker
 Athina Mavrommati, Greek actress who played in An itan to violi pouli